Sphenopholis intermedia, the slender wedgegrass or slender wedgescale, is an annual grass native to North America. The specific epithet "intermedia" means "intermediate". The diploid number is 14.

Description
The leaf sheaths can be pubescent or glabrous. The upper leaf blades are half as long or as long as their sheaths and are scabrous on their nerves. Most leaf blades are  broad and flat or slightly rolled.

The glumes are scabrous on their keels, with the first linear-attenuate and the second oblanceolate. The lemmas are lanceolate and are glabrous except for the most distal lemmas, which become scabrous at their ends. The paleas are thin, narrow, and slightly shorter than the lemmas.

S. intermedia flowers from June into August.

Distribution and habitat
It prefers wet soils, damp soils that dry after growing season, and clay soils with high water retention. It can be found from Newfoundland to southern Alaska, extending south to Florida, Louisiana, Colorado, and Arizona.

References

intermedia
Flora of North America
Plants described in 1909